Apocalypse 13 (Spanish language:Apocalipsis 13) is a 2003 Argentine black and white drama film directed and written by Óscar Aizpeolea.

Cast
Leonardo Aguinaga
Fabio Aste
Emiliano Biasol as Copito
Ivonne Fournery as Mater Dolorosa
Alejandro Laurnagaray as Alfa
Maria Marchione
Juan Manuel Morales
Pablo Ortolani
Gaston Santamarina
Leonardo Trento as Juglar
Daniela Zuppi

External links

2003 films
2000s Spanish-language films
2003 drama films
Argentine black-and-white films
Argentine drama films
2000s Argentine films